Gilmar Tadeu da Silva (born 18 November 1970), commonly known as Gil Paulista is a Brazilian football manager and former player.

Career
Gilmar was born in 1970 in São Paulo, started playing football at a well-known youth team called Pequeninos do Jockey in São Paulo, then moved to Portuguesa de Desportos when he became a professional player playing as striker. As a player he did not get much attention on the pitch but still managed to play in several teams.

 
After retiring, he started his career out the pitch abroad in 2008, working as assistant coach in Greece and Ukraine. In 2010, he coached the International Football Academy from Brazil (BIFA) on Cape Town/RSA International Football Tournament 2010. The competition which was organized by ONU and FIFA, gathered football academies from all over the world. Gilmar was the U17 Champion, beating an American academy at the final.

Late 2010, Gilmar moved to Metalurh Zaporizhya, to coach the Youth team, and a year later became the assistant coach of the main team, and participating in the whole process of the access of Metalurh to the first division in the 2011–12 season. In 2012, he started the process to obtain his UEFA coach license and completed FFU A Coaching Award UEFA A Diploma in 2016.

In 2014, Gilmar left Metalurh and moved back to Brazil to work for União Mogi and in 2015 for Osvaldo Cruz. Despite being a Brazilian footballer, he quickly identified differences between Europe and Brazil. He was quoted as saying, "First, the course (FFU UEFA) covers everything that involves football, so the coach there is called the manager, he participates from the hiring of personnel to the administration of the club. The football coach in Brazil is largely limited to team and games, with pressure for results". However, despite all constraints, Gilmar was positive about this experience in Brazil for his self improvement and continuous learning. In 2016, he managed to relocate himself to work in Saudi Arabi for  Al-Mojzel.

After a short break looking for a new team, he coached Chao Pak Kei (CPK), a Macanese team which competes in the Liga de Elite. CPK finished the 2018 Liga de Elite in the second position which is the best ranking ever. Gilmar was hired by FC Lviv in Ukraine, to be the head coach for the coming season.

Honours

Manager
Chao Pak Kei
 Liga de Elite: runner-up 2018

References

External links
 

1970 births
Living people
Brazilian footballers
Association football forwards
Ukrainian Premier League managers
DPMM FC players
Sociedade Esportiva e Recreativa Caxias do Sul players
Associação Portuguesa de Desportos players
Brazilian football managers
FC Lviv managers
Brazilian expatriate footballers
Expatriate footballers in Portugal
Brazilian expatriate sportspeople in Portugal
Expatriate footballers in India
Brazilian expatriate sportspeople in India
Expatriate football managers in Macau
Brazilian expatriate sportspeople in Macau
Brazilian expatriate football managers
Brazilian expatriate sportspeople in Ukraine
Expatriate football managers in Ukraine
Footballers from São Paulo